John Joseph "Brode" Shovlin (January 14, 1891 – February 16, 1976) was a second baseman in Major League Baseball. He played for the Pittsburgh Pirates and St. Louis Browns.

References

External links

1891 births
1976 deaths
Major League Baseball second basemen
Pittsburgh Pirates players
St. Louis Browns players
Baseball players from Pennsylvania
Erie Sailors players
Waterbury Champs players
Newark Newks players
Chillicothe Babes players
Columbus Senators players
Grand Rapids Black Sox players
Springfield Reapers players
Binghamton Triplets players
Wilkes-Barre Barons (baseball) players